Åresjön is a lake situated at  above mean sea level in Åredalen, Jämtland County, Sweden, with primary inflow and outflow being Indalsälven. The lake is  large, it has  of average depth and reaches  at the deepest point. The European route E14 and Mittbanan railway runs along the northern coastline through Åre and some minor settlements. Åre Ski Area lies on the northern bank of the lake; Åreskutan and Renfjället peaks are on each side of the valley. The lake is frozen from late November to early May, which makes it perfect for ice skating.

References 

Lakes of Jämtland County